Kyeremeh is an African surname that may refer to the following notable people:
Alex Kyeremeh, Ghanaian politician
Francis Kyeremeh (born 1997), Ghanaian football forward
Gideon Obeng Kyeremeh (born 2003), Ghanaian football forward 
Godson Kyeremeh (born 2000), French football midfielder 
Gyamfi Kyeremeh (born 1995), Belgian football winger
Joshua Kyeremeh, Ghanaian politician and administrator
Kwadwo Kyeremeh Baah (born 2003), English football forwards
Nicholas K. Adjei-Kyeremeh, Ghanaian politician